Cholón (Cholona), also known as Seeptsá and Tsinganeses, is a recently extinct language of Peru.

It was spoken near Uchiza, from Tingo María to Valle in the Huallaga River valley of Huanuco and San Martín regions.

Phonology 
Due to the amateur Spanish pronunciation spellings used to transcribe Cholon, its sound inventory is uncertain. The following is an attempt at interpreting them (Adelaar 2004:464). 

The vowels appeared to have been similar to Spanish .

Grammar 
Cholon distinguishes masculine and feminine grammatical gender in the second person. That is, one used different forms for "you" depending on whether one was speaking to a man or a woman:

References

 
Fabre, Alain. 2005. Diccionario etnolingüístico y guía bibliográfica de los pueblos indígenas sudamericanos: Cholón 

Indigenous languages of South America
Hibito–Cholon languages
Extinct languages of South America
Languages extinct in the 2000s